The Mediterranean Lingua Franca, or Sabir, was a pidgin language that was used as a lingua franca in the Mediterranean Basin from the 11th to the 19th centuries.

Etymology 
Lingua franca meant literally "Frankish language" in Late Latin, and it originally referred specifically to the language that was used around the Eastern Mediterranean Sea as the main language of commerce. However, the term "Franks" was actually applied to all Western Europeans during the late Byzantine Period. Later, the meaning of lingua franca expanded to mean any bridge language.

Origins 
Based mostly on Northern Italy's languages (mainly Venetian and Genoese) and secondarily on Occitano-Romance languages (Catalan and Occitan) in the western Mediterranean area at first, Lingua Franca later came to have more Spanish and Portuguese elements, especially on the Barbary Coast (now referred to as the Maghreb). Lingua Franca also borrowed from Berber, Turkish, French, Greek and Arabic.

The grammar of the language used aspects from many of its lexifiers. Infinitive was used for all verb forms and the lexicon was primarily Italo-Romance, with a Spanish interface. As in Arabic, vowel space was reduced, and Venetian influences can be seen in the dropping of certain vowels and intervocalic stops.

History
This mixed language was used widely for commerce and diplomacy and was also current among slaves of the bagnio, Barbary pirates and European renegades in precolonial Algiers. Historically, the first to use it were the Genoese and Venetian trading colonies in the eastern Mediterranean after the year 1000.

The similarities contribute to discussions of the classification of Lingua Franca as a language. Although its official classification is that of a pidgin, some scholars adamantly oppose that classification and believe it would be better viewed as an interlanguage of Italian.

Hugo Schuchardt (1842–1927) was the first scholar to investigate the Lingua Franca systematically. According to the monogenetic theory of the origin of pidgins that he developed, Lingua Franca was known by Mediterranean sailors including the Portuguese. When the Portuguese started exploring the seas of Africa, America, Asia and Oceania, they tried to communicate with the natives by mixing a Portuguese-influenced version of Lingua Franca with the local languages. When English or French ships came to compete with the Portuguese, the crews tried to learn the "broken Portuguese". A process of relexification caused the Lingua Franca and Portuguese lexicon to be substituted by the languages of the peoples in contact.

The theory is one way of explaining the similarities between most of the European-based pidgins and creole languages, such as Tok Pisin, Papiamento, Sranan Tongo, Krio and Chinese Pidgin English. Those languages use forms similar to sabir for 'to know' and piquenho for "children".

Lingua Franca left traces in present Algerian slang and Polari. There are traces even in geographical names, such as Cape Guardafui, which literally means "Cape Look and Escape" in Lingua Franca and ancient Italian.

Debate 
Many aspects of Lingua Franca are still largely up for debate and different scholars have different opinions. That is because Lingua Franca was a primarily oral language, with some accounts of it and examples in literature, but very little by way of real examples of the language in use. That may also reflect the language's unfixed and changing nature.

Debated aspects are the language's classification and the origin of the term "lingua franca".

Although the language is officially classified as a pidgin, some scholars argue that to be inaccurate and pointing instead toward an interlanguage of Italian or a koiné language.

Alternate origins for the term lingua franca include its translation as "free language", perhaps referring to free trade, or a translation from Arabic meaning "Latin language" or "trade language". It has also been translated to mean "Venetician" or "western language"  or simply to mean "French language".

Sample text
A sample of Sabir is found in Molière's comedy Le Bourgeois gentilhomme. At the start of the "Turkish ceremony", the Mufti enters singing the following words:

Se ti sabir
Ti respondir
Se non sabir
Tazir, tazir

Mi star Mufti:
Ti qui star ti?
Non intendir:
Tazir, tazir.

A comparison of the Sabir version with the same text in each of similar languages, first a word-for-word substitution according to the rules of Sabir grammar and then a translation inflected according to the rules of the similar language's grammar, can be seen below:

The Italian, Spanish, Catalan, Galician, Portuguese, Provençal, French, and Latin versions are not correct grammatically, as they use the infinitive rather than inflected verb forms, but the Sabir form is obviously derived from the infinitive in those languages. The correct version for each language is given in italics.

See also

 African Romance
 Mozarabic language
 Lingua Franca Nova

Notes

Bibliography 

 Brown, Joshua. 2022. "On the Existence of a Mediterranean Lingua Franca and the Persistence of Language Myths". Language Dynamics in the Early Modern Period (edited by Karen Bennett and Angelo Cattaneo). London: Routledge, pp. 169–189. .
 Dakhlia, Jocelyne, Lingua Franca – Histoire d'une langue métisse en Méditerranée, Actes Sud, 2008, .
 John A. Holm, Pidgins and Creoles, Cambridge University Press, 1989, p. 607.
 Henry Romanos Kahane, The Lingua Franca in the Levant: Turkish Nautical Terms of Italian and Greek Origin, University of Illinois, 1958.
 Hugo Schuchardt, "The Lingua Franca". Pidgin and Creole languages: selected essays by Hugo Schuchardt (edited and translated by Glenn G. Gilbert), Cambridge University Press, 1980. .
 Nolan, Joanna. 2020. The Elusive Case of Lingua Franca. Switzerland: Palgrave Macmillan.
 Drusteler, Eric R. 2012. "Speaking in Tongues: Language and communication in the Early Modern Mediterranean." Past and Present 217: 4-77. .
 Hitchcock, Louise A., and Aren M. Maeir. 2016. "A Pirate's Life for me: The Maritime culture of the Sea Peoples." Palestine Exploration Quarterly 148(4):245-264.
 Lang, George. 1992. "The Literary Settings of Lingua Franca (1300-1830)." Neophilologus 76(1): 64-76. .
 Operstein, Natalie. 2018. "Inflection in Lingua Franca: from Haedo's Topographia to the Dictionnaire de la langue franque." Morphology 28: 145-185. .

External links
 Dictionnaire de la Langue Franque ou Petit Mauresque, 1830. 
 A Glossary of Lingua Franca, fifth edition, 2005, Alan D. Corré. It includes articles about the language from various authors and sample texts.
 Tales in Sabir from Algeria
 Lingua franca in the Mediterranean (Google book)

Pidgins and creoles
Languages of Algeria
Languages of Tunisia
Languages of Sicily
Extinct languages of Africa
Extinct languages of Europe
Italian language
Romance languages
History of the Mediterranean
Languages attested from the 11th century
Languages extinct in the 19th century